Not Afraid to Stand Alone is the second studio album by American hip hop group Native Deen, released in November 2007 by Native Deen LLC.

Composition and release
Not Afraid to Stand Alone was released in November 2007. The album features fusion, R&B and hip hop, and throughout the album percussion instruments are solely used. A voice only version of the album was released.

The group incorporated a wider range of sounds and themes. The album features themes of praising Allah, hardships of being a Muslim, being steadfast in practicing Islam, fearing Allah, value of life, importance of prayer, about Prophet Muhammad, Dawah (calling others to Islam), Hajj (largest Islamic pilgrimage to Mecca), having trust in Allah and being proud of being a Muslim. The most notable change to their previous album is possibly the introduction of South African style singing, as well as more brooding examinations of the discrimination frequently faced by Muslims living in America.

Track listing

References

External links

2007 albums
Native Deen albums
Arabic-language albums